Charles Dago is an Ivorian former professional footballer. He played as a striker for K.S.C. Lokeren O.V. in the Belgian Pro League and for Al-Arabi, Al-Salmiya and Al-Tadamon in Kuwaiti Premier League.

References

External links
 Profile and stats - Lokeren

1975 births
Living people
Footballers from Abidjan
Association football forwards
Ivorian footballers
Ivorian expatriate footballers
Belgian Pro League players
K.S.C. Lokeren Oost-Vlaanderen players
Expatriate footballers in Belgium
Expatriate footballers in Kuwait
2000 African Cup of Nations players
Ivory Coast international footballers
Al Salmiya SC players
Ivorian expatriate sportspeople in Kuwait
Kuwait Premier League players
Al Tadhamon SC players
Al-Arabi SC (Kuwait) players
Expatriate footballers in the Democratic Republic of the Congo
Ivorian expatriate sportspeople in the Democratic Republic of the Congo